NGC 812 is a spiral galaxy located in the Andromeda constellation, an estimated 175 million light-years from the Milky Way. NGC 812 was discovered on December 11, 1876 by astronomer Édouard Stephan.

See also 
 List of NGC objects (1–1000)

References 

0812
Spiral galaxies
Andromeda (constellation)
008066